Liotia fenestrata is a species of sea snail, a marine gastropod mollusk in the family Liotiidae.

Description
The small, brownish white shell is clathrate by equidistant spiral and radiating riblets, with deep interstices. Its shape is at first subdiscoidal, but later variable. The apex is depressed. The nuclear whorls are flat and smooth. The teleoconch contains 2½ convex whorls. It is clathrate
by about 15 equidistant radiating and 7 spiral ribs, with deep pitted interspaces. The sculpture terminates with a spiral ridge surrounding the rather wide, deep umbilicus. The circular aperture is frequently slightly sloping and is slightly attached to the parietal wall. The inner lip is sinuated in the umbilical region.

Distribution
This marine species occurs in the Pacific Ocean off California.

References

External links
 To Biodiversity Heritage Library (21 publications)
 To Encyclopedia of Life
 To USNM Invertebrate Zoology Mollusca Collection
 To ITIS
 To World Register of Marine Species

fenestrata
Gastropods described in 1864